Steam Above a Pot is a 1950 Czechoslovak comedy film, directed by Miroslav Cikán. It stars  Vladimír Ráž, Eva Marie Kavanova, and Robert Vrchota.

References

External links
Steam Above a Pot at the Internet Movie Database

1950 films
Czechoslovak comedy films
1950 comedy films
Films directed by Miroslav Cikán
Czechoslovak black-and-white films
1950s Czech films